Monte Aymond is a village located in the Güer Aike Department of Santa Cruz Province of Argentina. The area has services such as telephony and shops, in addition to police assistance (Argentine National Gendarmerie and Carabineros de Chile) on both sides of the border.

References

Populated places in Santa Cruz Province, Argentina